Kadašman-Ḫarbe II, inscribed dKa-dáš-man-Ḫar-be, Kad-aš-man-Ḫar-be or variants and meaning I believe in Ḫarbe, the lord of the Kassite pantheon corresponding to Enlil, succeeded Enlil-nādin-šumi, as the 30th Kassite or 3rd dynasty king of Babylon. His reign was recorded as lasting only one year, six months, c. 1223 BC, as "MU 1 ITI 6" according to the Kinglist A, a formula which is open to interpretation.

Biography

He seems to have been elevated to the kingship following the downfall of Enlil-nādin-šumi after the invasion of Elamite forces under their king, Kidin-Hutran III. He may have ruled during the Assyrian hegemony of Tukulti-Ninurta I or possibly in the period between the capture of the earlier Kassite monarch, Kaštiliašu IV, and the second Assyrian campaign which conquered the city of Babylon. There is little known about the reign other than it was short, perhaps just a few months.

Despite the apparent brevity of his reign, there are six economic texts (clay tablets) dated to him. The two economic texts from Ur include a judgment of a case involving the aborted purchase of a boy called Bunni-Sîn and the aggressive steps his would-be buyer (Šamaš-ēṭir) took to seek return of his fee, including imprisoning the wife (Rihītuša) of the acting surety (Irība-ili). The other Ur text is dated seven months later and is a purchase contract for a cow with calf, where Šamaš-ēṭir once again acts as buyer. There are two texts from Nippur dated to his reign, one of which records the sale of a girl, one-half cubit in size, to Rabâ-ša-Ninimma, as a wife for his second son, Ninimma-zēra-šubši, for the price of two fine muḫtillû-garments, worth two shekels of gold, and some food. The other text is a ration list and is the earliest of the dated clay tablets.
 
The other texts, one of unknown origin and one apparently from Babylon remain unpublished. This second text would have presented a chronological problem as it could be dated Ṭebētu, 10th day tenth year if the Winkelhaken has been correctly read. It was recovered from the archive of Itti-Ezida-lummir in Babylon (Pedersén M8) along with another tablet of unconventional dating, leading Werner Nahm to suggest them both ancient fabrications. However, it is written in the heavily slanted paleography of late Middle Babylonian cuneiform and should probably read as 1 in contrast to the 10 date on the preceding line. The other five texts fall within a twelve-month period. Also, another tablet from Nippur mentions him probably in the context of an earlier transaction in his accession year: [M]U.SAG.˹NA˺[M.L]UGAL-rí ˹d˺ka-dáš-m[an-ḫar-b]e, but the date for the document omits a king’s name.

Inscriptions

References

13th-century BC Babylonian kings
Kassite kings
13th-century BC rulers